Thomas Hearne may refer to:
 Thomas Hearne (antiquarian) (1678–1735), English scholar
 Thomas Hearne (artist) (1744–1817), English landscape painter 
 Thomas Hearne (cricketer, born 1826) (1826–1900), English cricketer
 Thomas Hearne (cricketer, born 1887) (1887–1947), English cricketer